Russell Tuck was a British trade unionist, who was second-in-command of one of the country's largest unions and also sat on the executive of the Labour Party.

Tuck began working on the railways at the age of seventeen and was for a long time based in the signalbox at Rhondda Cutting, near Pontypridd. He joined the National Union of Railwaymen (NUR) and in his spare time studied economics and politics. Two of the other local signalbox operators, Joe Champion and D. T. Jones, were also very involved in NUR matters, and both later became Labour Party parliamentarians.

In 1970, Tuck was elected as an assistant general secretary of the NUR and, in 1975, he was promoted to become senior assistant general secretary. From then until his retirement, in 1983, he also represented the union on the National Executive Committee of the Labour Party.

References

Year of birth missing
Year of death missing
English trade unionists
Labour Party (UK) people